Sidney Haight (August 21, 1847 – September 17, 1918) was awarded the Medal of Honor during the American Civil War for actions during the Siege of Petersburg.

Military service

On 23 October 1863, Haight lied about his age and said he was 17 (he had turned 16 in August) and mustered into Federal service in Company E, of the 1st Michigan Volunteer Sharpshooters Regiment for three years.

On 2 February 1864, Haight was joined by his older brother James B who enlisted. The brothers would serve together until Spotsylvania when Jim was wounded in the left arm.

Haight was awarded the Medal of Honor during the debacle that was the Battle of the Crater. When the rebels counterattacked, "instead of retreating, remained in the captured works, regardless of his personal safety and exposed to the firing, which he boldly and deliberately returned until the enemy was close upon him." Haight was a Corporal serving with Company E, 1st Michigan Sharpshooters. Haight was noticed by men for his courage and seeming invincibility, as he and a Native American comrade from Company K, Antoine Scott, maintained a constant, accurate covering fire on the rebels until all who could have escaped. At that time, they also retreated.

Haight also participated in the recapture of the redoubt at the Battle of Fort Stedman where the 1st Michigan Sharpshooters, skirmishing for the 20th Michigan pinned down the rebels who had taken the for that they could not escape the counterattack and were taken prisoner. Haight's conduct was so outstanding that he was again recommended for a Medal of Honor.

Haight mustered out of Federal service with his regiment, 28 July 1865, still only seventeen-years-old. He married and had two sons: Elsworth Haight (1879–1917) and Benjamin Harrison Haight (1888–1957). He received the Medal of Honor for his heroic behavior in the Crater until the 1890s. He died on 17 September 1918, aged 71, survived by his brother James, who died in 1919, and his son Benjamin.

Medal of Honor citation

Notes

References

 
 
 
 
 
 
 
 }}

External links
 Sidney and James B. Haight – Civil War – 1st MI Sharpshooters
 

1847 births
1918 deaths
People of Michigan in the American Civil War
Union Army soldiers
United States Army Medal of Honor recipients
American Civil War recipients of the Medal of Honor